Take Five is an American sitcom that aired on CBS on April 1 and April 8, 1987. Six episodes were made, but only two were aired.

Premise
PR man Andy Kooper has a midlife crisis and dumps his wife and her father drops him from the payroll.

Cast
George Segal as Andy Kooper
Severn Darden as Dr. Noah Wolf
Derek McGrath as Al
Bruce Jarchow as Monty
Jim Haynie as Lenny Goodman
Melanie Chartoff as Laraine McDermott
Todd Field as Kevin Davis
Eugene Roche as Max Davis

Episodes

References

External links
 
TV.com
TV Guide

1987 American television series debuts
1987 American television series endings
1980s American sitcoms
English-language television shows
CBS original programming
Television series by Sony Pictures Television
Television shows set in San Francisco
Television series by Imagine Entertainment